The 1961–62 NBA season was the Packers' 1st season in the NBA. It would also be their only season for the franchise under that name.  They would be renamed the Chicago Zephyrs for the 1962–1963 season.

Roster

Regular season

Season standings

x – clinched playoff spot

Record vs. opponents

Game log

Awards and records
Walt Bellamy, NBA Rookie of the Year Award

References

Washington Wizards seasons
Chicago